German submarine U-108 was a Type IXB U-boat of Nazi Germany's Kriegsmarine that operated during World War II. She was laid down at DeSchiMAG AG Weser in Bremen as yard number 971 on 27 December 1938, launched on 15 July 1940 and commissioned on 22 October under Korvettenkapitän Klaus Scholtz.

Her service career began with training as part of the 2nd U-boat Flotilla; she went on to operations, first with the second flotilla, then with the 8th U-boat Flotilla.

Design
German Type IXB submarines were slightly larger than the original German Type IX submarines, later designated IXA. U-108 had a displacement of  when at the surface and  while submerged. She had two shafts and two  propellers.

U-108 was fitted with six  torpedo tubes (four fitted at the bow and two at the stern), 22 torpedoes, one  SK C/32 naval gun, 180 rounds, and a  SK C/30 as well as a  C/30 anti-aircraft gun. The boat had a complement of forty-eight.

Service history

She was a member of seven wolfpacks.

First, second and third patrols
The boat's first patrol began with her departure from Wilhelmshaven on 15 February 1941. She crossed the North Sea and entered the Atlantic via the gap between Iceland and the Faroe Islands, sinking Texelstroom on 22 February. She also sank Effna on the 28th; both ships met their end south of Iceland. She then docked at Lorient in occupied France on 12 March. She would be based there for most of the rest of her career.

The Convoy Commodore, four officer and 35 ratings were lost.

U-108 sank Michael E., a CAM ship or 'Catapult Armed Merchantman', on the submarine's third patrol on 2 June 1941 in mid-Atlantic.

Fourth, fifth and sixth patrols
Patrol number four saw the boat covering the 'gap' between South America and Africa. She departed Lorient on 19 August 1941 and returned on 21 October.

The boat's sixth patrol, as part of Operation Drumbeat (Paukenschlag), took her to the east coast of North America where she was again successful, sinking Ocean Venture on 8 February 1942, Tolosa on the ninth and Blink on the 12th. The U-boat had chased Blink, which had been hit by a non-detonating torpedo, the two vessels almost collided; which was only avoided by U-108 diving underneath the merchant ship.

She also sank Ramapo northwest of Bermuda on 16 February and Somme on the 18th.

Seventh, eighth and ninth patrols
The boat's seventh patrol was almost as successful as her sixth, sinking Modesta on 25 April 1942, Mobiloil on the 29th (which required a total of six torpedoes and many rounds from the 20mm and 37mm guns), Afoundria on 5 May, and Abgara a day later. On the return leg she encountered Norland on the 25th.

More success pennants were flown after her eighth patrol, which took her almost to the northern South American coast. She sank Tricula on 3 August 1942, Breňas on the seventh and Louisiana on the 17th.

The boat's ninth patrol was carried out in opposition to Operation Torch, (the Allied landings in North Africa). The submarine had not been off Morocco long before being attacked by a destroyer. The damage incurred was serious enough that the boat was obliged to return to France where effective repairs might be carried out.

Tenth and eleventh patrols
The U-boat was attacked by a Catalina flying boat of 202 Squadron RAF on 10 February 1943 west of Morocco. The damage to the forward torpedo tubes forced her to return to Lorient.

In her last operational patrol, she departed Lorient on 1 April 1943. On 19 April 1943 U-108 sank the American Robert Gray from Convoy HX 234. The Liberty ship had straggled behind the convoy. She was torpedoed and sunk in the Atlantic Ocean (50°57′N 40°35′W) with the loss of all 62 crew. U-108 was attacked by a destroyer on the 22nd but continued to shadow Convoy ON (S) 4 southeast of Greenland. She arrived at Stettin in modern-day Poland on 16 May. She was eventually bombed and sunk there on 11 April, before being raised and decommissioned on 17 July 1944. She was ultimately scuttled there on 24 April 1945.

Wolfpacks
U-108 took part in seven wolfpacks, namely.
 West (2 – 20 June 1941)
 Seeräuber (14 – 22 December 1941)
 Schlagetot (9 – 17 November 1942)
 Rochen (28 January - 11 February 1943)
 Adler (7 – 13 April 1943)
 Meise (13 – 27 April 1943)
 Specht (27 – 28 April 1943)

Summary of raiding history

References

Notes

Citations

Bibliography

External links

German Type IX submarines
U-boats commissioned in 1940
U-boats sunk in 1944
U-boats sunk by US aircraft
World War II submarines of Germany
1940 ships
Ships built in Bremen (state)
U-boats sunk by depth charges
Maritime incidents in April 1944
Maritime incidents in April 1945